The Coleman Theatre is a historic performance venue and movie house located on historic U.S. Route 66 in Miami, Oklahoma. Built in 1929 for George Coleman, a local mining magnate, it has a distinctive Spanish Colonial Revival exterior, and an elaborate Louis XV interior.  It was billed as the most elaborate theater between Dallas and Kansas City at the time of its opening, and played host to vaudeville acts, musical groups, and movies.  

It was listed on the National Register of Historic Places in 1983.

Like more than 100 other theaters in the Midwest, it was designed by the Boller Brothers architectural firm of Kansas City, Missouri.

It was built by Rucks-Brandt Construction Co.

It is a  theater/commercial structure.  It was originally intended to include commercial shops on the first floors of its east and south sides, where the entrances to the theater were located, and to include the Masonic Lodge Hall on the eastern half of its second floor.

See also

George L. Coleman Sr. House, also NRHP-listed in Miami
National Register of Historic Places listings in Ottawa County, Oklahoma

References

External links
Coleman Theatre web site

Theatres on the National Register of Historic Places in Oklahoma
Spanish Colonial Revival architecture in Oklahoma
Masonic buildings in Oklahoma
Buildings and structures completed in 1929
Buildings and structures in Ottawa County, Oklahoma
Miami, Oklahoma